Morning Star, morning star, or Morningstar may refer to:

Astronomy
 Morning star, most commonly used as a name for the planet Venus when it appears in the east before sunrise
 See also Venus in culture
 Morning star, a name for the star Sirius, which appears in the sky just before sunrise from early July to mid-September
 Morning star, a (less common) name for the planet Mercury when it appears in the east before sunrise
 Heliacal rising, the astronomical occurrence when a star rises and becomes visible over the eastern horizon before sunrise, thus becoming a morning star.

Mythology and theology
 Aurvandil, the Morning Star, or Rising Star, in Germanic mythology
 At-Tariq, a chapter of the Quran 
 Barnumbirr, a creator-spirit in the Yolngu culture of Australia
 Jesus, self-described as "the bright Morning Star" in the Christian Bible
 John the Baptist, called a "bright morning star" in Eastern Orthodox Church hymnology
 Lucifer, a name based on the Latin name for the Morning Star
 Mary, mother of Jesus, called "morning star" in the Litany of Loreto
 Morning Star, one of the Zorya (gods in Slavic mythology)
 Morningstar or Red Horn, a culture hero in Siouan oral traditions
 Morning Star ceremony, an historical ritual ceremony in Pawnee mythology
 Morning Star ceremony, a Yolngu (Aboriginal Australian) ceremony associated with Barnumbirr
 Phosphorus (morning star), the Morning Star in Greek mythology
 Tlāhuizcalpantecuhtli, god of the morning star (Venus) Aztec mythology

People
 John Wycliffe, English theologian, sometimes referred to as the "Morning Star of the Reformation"
 Morning Star (chief) (1810–1883), Northern Cheyenne leader, also known as Dull Knife
 Chip Morningstar, American author, developer, programmer and designer of software systems
 Darren Morningstar (born 1969), American basketball player
 Erica Morningstar (born 1989), Canadian swimmer
 Richard Morningstar (born 1945), ambassador, Special Envoy of the United States Secretary of State for Eurasian Energy

Places

Settlements in the United States
 Morning Star, Arkansas, an unincorporated community
 Morning Star, Virginia, an unincorporated community
 Morning Star, West Virginia, an unincorporated community
 Morningstar, U.S. Virgin Islands

Water features
 Morning Star Lake (Glacier County, Montana), United States
 Morning Star Lake (Nebraska), United States
 Morning Star River, County Limerick, Ireland, flows into River Maigue

Other
 Morningstar Airfield, near Cape Town, Western Cape, South Africa
 Morningstar Mill, a heritage site in St. Catharines, Ontario, Canada

Transportation

Ships
 HMS Morning Star, six ships of the Royal Navy
 Morning Star, original name of the USS Estes, an amphibious force command ship
 , one of many vessels of that name
 Morning Star, former name of the cruise ship Salamis Glory
 Morning Star of Revelation (TS-K182), a British sail-training ketch
 Morning Star, the first Star Ferry in Hong Kong, and several later ferries by the same name in the same fleet
 De Ochtendster (The Morning Star in Dutch), took part in the Battle of Gibraltar (1607)

In railways
 Morning Star (train), passenger train formerly operated by St. Louis Southwestern Railway
 GWR Star Class "Morning Star", broad gauge steam locomotive

Businesses and organizations

Businesses
 Morningstar Farms, a brand of vegetarian food
 Morning Star Series, a brand of incense
 Morningstar Air Express, a cargo airline based in Edmonton, Alberta, Canada
 Morningstar, Inc., an American investment research firm based in Chicago
 The Morning Star Company, a California-based agribusiness and food processing company

Organizations
 Morningstar Commune, formed in Sonoma County in the mid-1960s
 Morning Star Boys' Ranch, Spokane, Washington
 Morning Star Trust, U.K.-based, Christian sail training charity
 Morning Star International, former name of Every Nation Churches, an organization of non-denominational churches

Arts and entertainment

Literature

Comics
 Morning Star (comics), a fictional Marvel Comics villain
 Lucifer (DC Comics) (Lucifer Morningstar), a DC character who primarily appears in The Sandman comic books by Neil Gaiman
 Morningstar, a superhero from the Bogatyri comic books
 Morningstar, a character in the Elementals comic book

News media
 Morning Star (British newspaper)
 Former Morning Star (London newspaper)
 The Morning Star (British Columbia newspaper), Canada
 Former The Morning Star (New Hampshire newspaper), US
 Morning Star, established 1867 in Wilmington, North Carolina, US, renamed Star-News in 2003
 Magic City Morning Star, an on-line newspaper, Katahdin, Maine, US

Novels
 Morning Star (Haggard novel), a 1910 novel by H Rider Haggard
 Morning Star (Raven novel), a 1984 novel by Simon Raven
 Morning Star (Brown novel), a 2016 novel by Pierce Brown
 The Morning Star (novel), 2020 novel by Karl Ove Knausgård
 Morningstar, a 1992 novel by David Gemmell
 The Morning Star, a 2001–2003 trilogy of novels by Nick Bantock
 Morning Star, a character in the Noble Warriors Trilogy of novels by William Nicholson
 Morningstar, a character from the novel Jack of Shadows by Roger Zelazny

Other literature
 The Morning Star, a play by Emlyn Williams
 The Morning Star, a 1979 book of poems and translations by Kenneth Rexroth
 "Luceafărul" (poem), an 1883 narrative poem sometimes translated as "The Morning Star"

Film and television
 Morning Star (film), a 1959 Soviet ballet film
 Morning Star (TV series), US, 1965–1966
 Morning Star (talk show), Philippines 2004–2005
 Morning Star (The Walking Dead), an episode of the television series The Walking Dead
 Morning Star, a planned film about Djalu Gurruwiwi
 Lucifer Morningstar, a character in the TV series Lucifer

Music
Morning Star (opera), by Ricky Ian Gordon
 "Morning Star" (carol), an 1836 traditional Moravian carol
 The Morningstars, a band fronted by Sierra Leonean musician S. E. Rogie

Albums
 Morning Star (Entombed album), 2001
 Morning Star (Flunk album), 2004
 Morning Star (Hubert Laws album), 1972
 Morning Star (Spear of Destiny album), 2003
 Morningstar, an album by the American electronic music band Asmodeus X
 The Morning Star (Daniel Bachman album), 2018
 Criminal Intents/Morning Star, a 2009 EP by the band Dope Stars Inc.

Songs
 "Morningstar", by AFI on the album The Art of Drowning
 "Morning Star", by Amorphis on the album Tuonela
 "Morning Star", by Angra on the album Temple of Shadows
 "Morningstar",  by Baroness on the album Purple
 "Morning Star", by Cass McCombs on the album Big Wheel and Others
 "Morning Star", a musical work for wind ensemble composed by David Maslanka
 "The Morningstar", by Draconian on the album The Burning Halo
 "Morning Star, Durbanville", by Fokofpolisiekar on the album Swanesang
 "Morning Star", by Hank Marvin
 "Morning Star" (Nat King Cole song), 1958
 "Morning Star" (N-Dubz song), 2011
 "Morning Star", by Roger Shah featuring the voice of Moya Brennan
 "Morning Star", by Stiff Gins
 "Morning Star", by Taylor Davis
 "Draconian Trilogy: Morning Star", by Therion on the album Vovin
 "Morning Star", by Amberian Dawn on the album The Clouds of Northland Thunder
 "Morning Star", by King Woman

Other arts
 Morning Star, a painting by Alex Janvier

Other uses
 Morning Star (cannabis), a strain
 Morning star (candlestick pattern),  in a financial chart
 Morning star (weapon), a spiked mace
 Morning Star flag, of West Papua
 Morningstar Style Box

See also
The Evening and the Morning Star (1832–1834), the first newspaper of the Latter Day Saint movement
 Evening Star (disambiguation)
 Morgenster (disambiguation)
 Morgenstern (disambiguation)
 Nightstar (disambiguation)
 Rising Star (disambiguation)